The 1920 New Brunswick general election was held on 9 October 1920, to elect 48 members to the 35th New Brunswick Legislative Assembly, the governing house of the province of New Brunswick, Canada. Although political parties had no standing in law, twenty-four MLA declared themselves to be Liberals, thirteen declared themselves to be Conservatives, nine declared themselves to members of the United Farmers, and two declared themselves Farmer-Labour.

The election resulted in the first minority government in New Brunswick since the advent of responsible government in the 1840s.

This was the first general election in which women could vote. They would not be allowed to run for office until 1934, following the 1919 act to extend the franchise to women.

References

Further reading
 

1920 elections in Canada
Elections in New Brunswick
1920 in New Brunswick
October 1920 events